Bobby Johnstone was a Scottish footballer who played during the 1960s.  He first signed 'senior' for Stirling Albion before transferring to Airdrie and then to Dumbarton.

References

Scottish footballers
Dumbarton F.C. players
Stirling Albion F.C. players
Airdrieonians F.C. (1878) players
Scottish Football League players
Muirkirk Juniors F.C. players
Association football wing halves
Troon F.C. players
20th-century births
Living people
Place of birth missing (living people)
Year of birth missing (living people)